Pedaparimi is a village in Guntur district of the Indian state of Andhra Pradesh. It is located in Thullur mandal of Guntur revenue division. It lies adjacent to state capital Amaravati.

Demographics 

 Census of India, Pedaparmi had a population of 6,887. The total population constitutes 3,388 males and 3,499 females with a sex ratio of 1033 females per 1000 males. 646 children are in the age group of 0–6 years, a ratio of 1019 girls per 1000 boys. The average literacy rate stands at 66.16% with 4,129 literates, slightly lower than the state average of 67.41%.

See also 
Villages in Thullur mandal

References

Villages in Guntur district